Egypt competed at the 1988 Summer Olympics in Seoul, South Korea. 49 competitors, 48 men and 1 woman, took part in 36 events in 12 sports.

Competitors
The following is the list of number of competitors in the Games.

Athletics

Men's 400 metres hurdles
 Ahmed Ghanem
 Qualifying Heat – 50.44s (→ did not advance)

Men's Shot Put
 Ahmed Shatta
 Qualifying Heat – 17.61m (→ did not advance)
 Mohamed Achouch
 Qualifying Heat – 18.94m (→ did not advance)

Men's Discus Throw
 Mohamed Hamed Naguib
 Qualifying Group-B – No Mark (→ did not advance)

Basketball

Men's tournament

Team roster

Group play

Classification round 9–12

Classification round 11/12

Boxing

Men's Light Flyweight (– 48 kg)
 Hassan Mustafa
 First Round — Bye
 Second Round — Lost to Leopoldo Serrantes (Philippines), RSC-2

Equestrianism

Fencing

Two fencers, both men, represented Egypt in 1988.

Men's foil
 Abdel Monem El-Husseini
 Ahmed Mohamed

Judo

Modern pentathlon

Three male pentathletes represented Egypt in 1988.

Men's Individual Competition:
 Mohamed Abdou El-Souad – 4853 pts (→ 31st place)
 Ayman Mahmoud – 4675 pts (→ 46th place)
 Moustafa Adam – 4585 pts (→ 50th place)

Men's Team Competition:
 Abouelsouad, Mahmoud, and Adam – 14113 pts (→ 13th place)

Shooting

Swimming

Men's 50m Freestyle
 Mohamed Elazoul
 Heat – 24.64 (→ did not advance, 42nd place)
 Mohamed Hassan
 Heat – 25.11 (→ did not advance, 48th place)

Men's 100m Freestyle
 Mostafa Amer
 Heat – 53.57 (→ did not advance, 45th place)

Men's 200m Freestyle
 Mostafa Amer
 Heat – 1:57.50 (→ did not advance, 47th place)

Men's 100m Backstroke
 Amin Amer
 Heat – 1:00.76 (→ did not advance, 39th place)

Men's 200m Butterfly
 Ahmed Abdalla
 Heat – 2:05.28 (→ did not advance, 31st place)

Men's 4 × 100 m Freestyle Relay
 Mohamed Elazoul, Amin Amer, Mohamed Hassan, and Mostafa Amer
 Heat – DSQ (→ did not advance, no ranking)

Table tennis

Weightlifting

Wrestling

Kamal Ibrahim, Men's Light-Heavyweight wrestler

References

Nations at the 1988 Summer Olympics
1988
1988 in Egyptian sport